Krishan Lal Thakur is an Indian politician and Independant MLA from Nalagarh Constituency in Himachal Pradesh.Thakur won 2022 assembly elections by defeating Congress and BJP candidate by a huge margin of 13264 votes. Thakur became a member of the Himachal Pradesh Legislative Assembly from the Nalagarh constituency in Solan district second time. Earlier he represented Nalagarh Constituency from 2012 to 2017. He is banned from BJP for more than 6 years for fighting election as Independant against BJP candidate in 2022 Assembly Elections. However, Thakur proved his power by defeating BJP and Congress candidates with BJP sliding to third position in Nalagarh constituency.Son of Shri Amar Chand Thakur; born on 20 April, 1961 at Androla, Distt. Solan; B.Tech. (Civil Engineering); married to Smt.  Poonam Thakur and have one son and one daughter.
         Before taking VRS from the post of the Executive Engineer on 3rd September, 2012 served Jal Shakti Vibhag for twenty three years. 

</ref>

Electoral performance

References 

People from Solan district
Bharatiya Janata Party politicians from Himachal Pradesh
Himachal Pradesh MLAs 2012–2017
Living people
21st-century Indian politicians
Year of birth missing (living people)